Étienne Morin (born around 1717, perhaps in the region of Cahors and died in Kingston, Jamaica in 1771), was a trader acting between the Caribbean and Bordeaux. He is best known for the central role he played in Freemasonry in the genesis of the Ancient and Accepted Scottish Rite.

References

1717 births
1771 deaths
French Freemasons